Aeolid may refer to:

 Aeolis, an ancient Greek district of coastal Asia Minor, including the island of Lesbos
 Aeolidida, a clade of Nudibranch (carnivorous sea slugs)